Carson Lake may refer to one of several lakes:

In Canada:
Carson Lake in Manitoba in Riding Mountain National Park, NTS map sheet 62J12
One of two lakes of that name in York County, New Brunswick, one on NTS map sheet 21J15, the other on NTS map sheet 21J10
Carson Lake (Ontario), one of six lakes of that name in Ontario
One of two lakes of that name in Saskatchewan, one on NTS map sheet 064L11, the other on NTS map sheet 63L09

In the United States:
Carson Lake in Garfield County, Nebraska
Carson Lake (now Carson Sink), Churchill County, Nevada
Carson Lake Clark County, South Dakota
Carson Lake Madison County, Texas
Carson Lake Mason County, Washington
Carson Lake Fremont County, Wyoming
Carson Lakes Sweetwater County, Wyoming
There is also a Scout Carson Lake in Alpine County, California

References